Qubbat al-Khazna, also known as the Bayt al-Mal or Beit al-Mal, is an old structure within the courtyard of the Umayyad Mosque in Damascus, Syria. It is an octagonal structure decorated with mosaics, standing on eight Roman columns. The dome was built under orders from the Abbasid governor of Damascus, Fadl ibn Salih, in 789. 

The exterior walls of the structure were originally covered in colorful mosaic decoration which imitated the earlier Umayyad-era mosaics in the rest of the mosque, although they are of slightly lesser quality than the latter. The mosaics were restored in 13th or 14th century and then in the late 20th century they were almost entirely redone based on existing fragments. The Roman columns that were re-used for the structure's pillars were truncated to achieve the desired height but preserve original Roman-era capitals.

The dome used to hold the mosque's large endowments. Some Greek, Latin, Syriac, Coptic, Hebrew, Aramaic, and Georgian old manuscripts were also housed in Qubbat al-Khazna in the past (e.g. Uncial 0126, 0144, 0145). The manuscripts were generally kept out of view, but were allowed to be handled briefly by German scholars when German Emperor Wilhelm II visited Damascus in 1898.

References

Bibliography 
 Arianna D'Ottone, Manuscript as Mirror of a Multi-lingual and Multi-cultural Society. The case of the Damascus find, [in:] Convivencia in Byzantium? Cultural Exchanges in a Multi-Ethnic and Multi-Lingual Society, edited by B. Crostini-S. La Porta, Trier, Wissenschaftlicher Verlag Trier, 2013, pp. 63–88.

External links 

 M. M. Sharif, The First Three Centuries of Muslim Architecture, Wiesbaden 1966.

Buildings and structures inside the walled city of Damascus
Architecture in Syria
Buildings and structures completed in 789